Ngayaba, also known as Tibea, is a Bantu language spoken in three villages in Cameroon.

References

Bafia languages
Languages of Cameroon

de:Lefa (Sprache)
pms:Lenga Lefa